The three governors controversy was a political crisis in the U.S. state of Georgia from 1946 to 1947. On December 21, 1946, Eugene Talmadge, the governor-elect of Georgia, died before taking office. The state constitution did not specify who would assume the governorship in such a situation, so three men made claims to the governorship: Ellis Arnall, the outgoing governor; Melvin E. Thompson, the lieutenant governor-elect; and Herman Talmadge, Eugene Talmadge's son. Eventually a ruling by the Supreme Court of Georgia settled the matter in favor of Thompson. Georgia's Secretary of State Ben Fortson hid the state seal in his wheelchair so no official business could be conducted until the controversy was settled.

Three contenders 

Three men made claims to the governorship: Ellis Arnall, the outgoing governor, Melvin E. Thompson, the lieutenant governor-elect, and Herman Talmadge, Eugene Talmadge's son.

Arnall stated that he would remain in office until his successor was properly sworn in, while Thompson said that he should be sworn in as governor in Eugene Talmadge's place, upon his swearing-in as lieutenant governor. Eugene Talmadge's supporters had been unsure of his chances of surviving until he was sworn in, so they did some research into the state constitution and concluded that if he died, the Georgia General Assembly would choose between the second and third-place finishers. As Talmadge ran unopposed, they secretly arranged for some write-in votes for Eugene's son, Herman Talmadge, who had run his father's successful campaign for governor.

Legislative action 

Thompson wanted the General Assembly to certify the election returns before addressing the issue of who should be governor. Once the certification was done, Thompson would have a stronger claim, as he would officially be the Lieutenant Governor-elect, but Talmadge's forces were successful in postponing the certification. On January 15, 1947, the General Assembly elected Herman Talmadge as governor.

Both Arnall and Thompson refused to accept the vote by the General Assembly. Thompson began legal proceedings, appealing to the Supreme Court of Georgia. Arnall physically refused to leave, so on January 15, 1947, both Talmadge and Arnall sat in the Georgia State Capitol claiming to be the governor. The next day, Talmadge took control of the governor's office and arranged to have the locks changed. Arnall soon relinquished his claim and supported Thompson's claim.

Judicial action 

The state's highest court, the Supreme Court of Georgia, ruled in March 1947 that the legislature had violated the state constitution by electing Talmadge governor and that Thompson should serve as governor until the next general election in November 1948. The court directed that in November 1948 there would be a special election at which voters would choose someone to complete Eugene Talmadge's term.

Following the court's decision, Herman Talmadge ceded the office of governor to Thompson, ending the controversy. Talmadge then ran for governor in 1948, defeating Governor Thompson for the Democratic nomination with 51.8% of the votes to Thompson's 45.1%. Talmadge then went on to win the November special election with 97.51% of the vote. He served the final 26 months (November 1948 to January 1951) of the term for which his father had been elected, and was elected for a further full term in November 1950.

See also 
 List of governors of Georgia

References

Further reading 

 
 
 
 
 
 

Governor of Georgia (U.S. state)
Georgia (U.S. state) elections
1946 in Georgia (U.S. state)
1947 in Georgia (U.S. state)
Political history of Georgia (U.S. state)